{{Infobox military unit
|unit_name= INAS 552, Naval Flight Test Squadron
|image= INAS 552 insignia.jpg
|image_size= 200px
|caption= NFTS, INAS 552 Insignia
|dates= 7 July 2005 - '|country= 
|allegiance=
|branch= 
|type=
|role= 
|size=
|command_structure= 
|current_commander= 
|garrison=HQNA, Goa
|ceremonial_chief=
|colonel_of_the_regiment=
|nickname= The X-plorers
|patron=
|motto=
|colors=
|march=
|mascot=
|battles= 
|anniversaries=
|aircraft_fighter= BAE Sea Harrier (trainer/ other aircraft including fixed wing and rotary wing) 
}}INAS 552''' is an Indian naval air squadron based at INS Hansa, Goa and is functioning as Naval Flight Test Squadron (NFTS) under HQNA.

References 

Aircraft squadrons of the Indian Navy
Military units and formations established in 2005